Moro Branislav (Serbian Cyrillic: Моро Бранислав; born 22 April 1957) is a Serbian volleyball coach who led the PSL Manila selection team at the 2016 FIVB Volleyball Women's Club World Championship. He is the current head coach of the Chinese Taipei men's national volleyball team.

Coaching career

Background
Branislav, a Level-3 FIVB coach and FIVB instructor, he has coached numerous clubs in various countries such as Belarus, Greece, Kuwait, Libya, North Korea, the Philippines, Romania, Saudi Arabia, and Tunisia. He also coached the national teams of the now defunct Yugoslavia, Zaire, Romania, and North Korea.

He is an instructor at the FIVB - Development Centres.

North Korea
In 2015, Branislav went to North Korea to coach the volleyball team of the 4.25 Sports Club. He led the team at the 2015 and 2016 Asian Volleyball Club Championships. The club finished at 6th place in Vietnam and 9th place in the Philippines.

He was also appointed as the head coach of the women's national team of North Korea in those years.

PSL All Stars
In September 2016, Branislav was appointed as the head coach of the PSL Manila, a selection team composed mainly of Philippine Super Liga (PSL) players, that was set to participate at the 2016 FIVB Club World Championship. The management of the team was waiting for Branislav's availability for the replacement of the Japanese coach Shun Takahashi, who was reassigned as the team's first assistant coach. The team finished at 9th place after the championship.

Foton Tornadoes
Branislav also took charge of the Foton Tornadoes, a club that plays in the Philippine Super Liga, after its former coach Fabio Menta was relieved from his post. His 30-day contract with the team began on October 8, 2016. His contract was then extended until the last day of the year. Branislav renewed his contract with Foton in January 2017.

He led the team to its second championship title at the 2016 PSL Grand Prix, sweeping the finals against Petron. In the 2017 season, however, the club finished with the bronze medal after losing to Petron in the semifinal round. He left the team after his contract expired. He cited better offers from other PSL teams for his decision. Three PSL teams were looking to sign Branislav as their new head coach before the 2018 season started.

Cocolife
On December 28, 2017, PSL club, Cocolife Asset Managers announced they have signed in Moro Branislav as their head coach. Branislav, who agreed with a 2-year contract, has begun leading the squad at the 2018 PSL Grand Prix Conference. The club finished at 4th place after the championship.

Club career

Personal Information
Branislav attended the University of Physical Culture, University of Menadzment, and Higher Coaching School Belgrade.

References

External links
 CEV Profile
 FIVB Profile

1957 births
Living people
Serbian volleyball coaches
Serbian expatriate sportspeople in North Korea
Serbian expatriate sportspeople in the Philippines